LSM may refer to:

Science
Laboratoire Souterrain de Modane (Modane Underground Laboratory), a particle physics laboratory in France
Lanthanum strontium manganite, a crystal used as a cathode material
Laser scanning microscopy, a microscopy technique used in biology and nano-crystal imaging
Least squares method, a method in regression analysis
LSm, a family of RNA-binding proteins
LSM-775, a psychedelic drug similar to LSD, although less potent

Sports
 Liga Super Malaysia (Malaysia Super League), a top-tier association football league in Malaysia
 Long-stick midfielder, a player position in field lacrosse

Technology
Land Surface Model (LSM version 1.0), a unidimensional computational model
Latent semantic mapping, for modelling data relationships
Level-set method, for numerical analysis of interfaces and shapes
Linear scheduling method, a project scheduling method for repetitive activities
Linear synchronous motor, an electric motor
Linux Security Modules, a modular framework for security checks in Linux
Linux Software Map, file format
Liquid state machine, a type of neural network
 Live Slow Motion Multicam (LSM), instant-replay software developed by EVS
Log-structured merge-tree, a data structure

Education
Lourdes School of Mandaluyong, Philippines
Louvain School of Management, Belgium

Organizations
Law Society of Manitoba
Lesbian Sex Mafia, a female support group and BDSM organization
Little St Mary's, an Anglo-Catholic parish in Cambridge
Living Stream Ministry, religious publisher
Lutheran Student Movement – USA

Other uses
Landing Ship Medium, a U.S. Navy amphibious warfare ship class
Libre Software Meeting, an annual free software event in France
San Martín Line (Linea San Martín), commuter rail line in Buenos Aires
Local store marketing, a marketing term
Mexican Sign Language (Lengua de Señas Mexicana)
Latvijas Sabiedriskais medijs (Latvian Public Broadcasting), a publicly funded radio and television organization in Latvia
Living Standards Measure, a classification of Standard of living in South Africa

See also